Jean-Claude Guiguet (22 November 1948 – 18 September 2005) was a French film director and screenwriter. He directed eight films between 1978 and 2005. His film Les passagers was screened in the Un Certain Regard section at the 1999 Cannes Film Festival.

Filmography
 Les belles manières (1978)
 L'archipel des amours (1983)
 Faubourg St Martin (1986)
 Peinture fraîche (1991)
 Le Mirage (1992)
 Les passagers (1999)
 Métamorphose (2003)
 Portraits, traits privés (2005)

References

External links

1948 births
2005 deaths
People from Isère
French film directors
French male screenwriters
20th-century French screenwriters
Deaths from cancer in France
20th-century French male writers